Loewia foeda is a European species of fly in the family Tachinidae. It was first found in North America in 1972. The species is a parasitoid of centipedes.

References

Tachininae
Diptera of Europe
Insects described in 1824